Termitomastus is a genus of midges in the family Cecidomyiidae. The one described species - Termitomastus leptoproctus - is found in the South America. The genus was established in 1901 by Italian entomologist Filippo Silvestri.

References

Cecidomyiidae genera

Insects described in 1901
Taxa named by Filippo Silvestri
Monotypic Diptera genera